Beavers is a programme associated with some Scouting organizations generally for children aged 6 to 8 who are too young for the Cub programme.

Beavers programmes had their origins in the Northern Ireland organization The Little Brothers, founded in 1963 and renamed "Beavers" in 1966 to provide a programme for boys who were too young to be Wolf Cubs. A Beavers programme for Scouts Canada was designed and tested in 1971 and adopted in 1974. Since then, other scouting organizations in some countries have developed their own Beavers or similar programmes. Some organizations do not call their programmes "Beavers" and often use an animal local to their region instead. Many share common ideas between them, such as: 
 A Beaver pledge and/or motto,
 Earning merit badges 
 A Beaver uniform, distinct from that of older Cubs 
 Organized in groups, each called a Beaver "Colony", with optional smaller groups called "Lodges" 
 Special ceremonies to commemorate new members, and the graduation of the oldest Beaver members into Cubs 
 Symbols unique to Beavers and distinct from Cubs, such as sitting and standing formations, salutes, and handshakes 
 Use of lore and nicknames sourced from Harry McCartney's 1971 short story Friends of the Forest 

Many Beaver groups that began as boys only now allow girls into their programmes as well, and many Beaver programmes which were not initially considered official parts of their parent scouting organizations are now fully embraced by them.

The Boy Scouts of America never created a distinct identity for children of this age. Instead, over time, their Cub programme has expanded to fill this age group. Others, such as some Traditional Scouting organizations have never adopted programmes for younger children at all, typically on the grounds this was not one of Robert Baden-Powell's original programmes.

History
A pre-Cub scheme was set up in Northern Ireland by the 1st Dromore Group in 1963 and it was called The Little Brothers spreading to Belfast with seven groups two years later. The creation of an under eight provision was sparked by the launch of other younger sections in other youth organizations at the time including the Anchors section of the Boys' Brigade which some feared was partly causing a drop in numbers of Cubs experienced at the time. As the scheme expanded throughout the rest of the province, it was given the official name of Beavers in 1966, having been a name considered by Robert Baden-Powell when creating Wolf Cubs.

A Canadian Beaver programme was designed and tested in Winnipeg, Manitoba in 1971 by Harry McCartney, Alan Jones, and Gordon Hanna. and in 1972 it was expanded across the Scouts Canada organization. It was made an official programme of Scouts Canada in 1974.

This was closely followed by the Republic of Ireland in the same year. Beaver became an official section in the Scout Association of the United Kingdom in 1986. Beavers and programmes for similar ages spread to a few other Scouting organizations around the world. Beavers were not formally adopted by many Scouting organizations until well into the 1980s.

Beaver programmes around the world

Australia

Baden-Powell Scouts' Association in Australia

The Baden-Powell Scouts' Association in Australia has a programme called Koalas, although some Groups do not operate Koalas as they were not part of Baden-Powell's concept.  The programme serves 5 to eight year olds, and is followed by Wolf Cubs. The Koalas programme uses a catch phrase and themes around "Koalas climb high" with participants reciting the phrase and mimicking the motions of a climbing Koala.

Scouts Australia

Scouts Australia, has a programme called Joeys for 5 to 7 year olds. A joey is an infant kangaroo. The Joeys programme uses a catch phrase and themes around "Hop, Hop, Hop" such as Help Other People with participants reciting the phrase and mimicking the motions of a hopping joey kangaroo.

Canada

Scouts Canada

In Scouts Canada Beavers are aged five to seven. Members normally wear a brown vest as a uniform with a brown Beaver coby hat.

The Scouts Canada Beavers programme is based on the specially written short story Friends of the Forest written by Harry McCartney. McCartney was the Manitoba Executive Scout Director in 1971. With the help of two others, Alan Jones, and Gordon Hanna, the Beavers programme was tested and successfully brought to Scouts Canada officially and country-wide, by 1974.

A five-year-old Beaver is a brown tail, a six-year-old is a blue tail and a seven-year-old is a white tail. The tail is attached to the back brim of the Beaver Hat on a Beaver's uniform.

Beavers, at the end of their third (white tail) year, participate in a "swim-up" ceremony to become Cubs.

Association des Scouts du Canada
In the Association des Scouts du Canada Castors (Beavers in French) are aged from seven to nine. Members normally wear a yellow T-shirt and tan or brown pants. The programme is based on a specially written story called Les aventures de Cartouche et Namor (The Adventures of Cartouche and Namor).

Castor Promise:
Je m'engage à faire des efforts pour jouer avec et comme les autres. (I promise to do my best to play with and like others)

Castor Motto:
Effort (Effort)

The new Beaver receives his neckerchief and uniform at a promise ceremony where the Beaver, generally, must demonstrate that he has joined the unit. From that moment, the new Beavers have entered the Beaver programme.

Beavers collect individual badges following a four-step programme:

Source (spring) which is for objective integration
Ruisseau (stream) which is for objective participation
Cascades (waterfall) which is for objective initiative
Étang (pond) which is for objective sharing

They can also collect two technique badges which are called buchettes (splint): Security and Environnement.

When they climb to Cubs, they receive a badge called "Castor découvreur" (discovering beaver).

Baden-Powell Service Association
In the Baden-Powell Service Association in Canada, the corresponding section for this age group is called Otters.

Ireland

Japan
Beaver Scouts (Japanese: ビーバースカウト) started in Japan in 1986. Like all of the Scout Association of Japan units, Beavers have been coed since 1995.  Beavers are the youngest age group in Scouting Japan, a two year programme that covers 1st and 2nd grades.

Mexico
In Asociación de Scouts de México, A.C. there was a Beaver Section, but it has been closed down. However, there are many beaver groups or "castores" in Spanish working unofficially in parallel.

New Zealand
Scouts New Zealand has a programme called Keas for this age group. A kea is a New Zealand parrot.

South Africa
In 2019, Scouts South Africa launched a Meerkats programme for children age 5 and 6. The motto "Stand Tall" is based on the upright posture of a meerkat standing guard near its burrow.

Switzerland

Various troops in Switzerland also have Beavers (in some Cantons also called Fünkli, Füchse or Murmeli), but they are not officially recognised by the Swiss Guide and Scout Movement.

They usually only wear the troop's neckerchief but have no uniform.

United Kingdom

The Scout Association

The Scout Association officially recognised Beavers in 1986, but there had been a fully fledged Beaver section in Northern Ireland since 1966, plus informal colonies in other parts of the UK country for many years prior to 1986. The programme is run for 5¾ to 8 year olds, and precedes Cubs.

The Beavers section currently makes up the largest proportion of participants within The Scout Association in the United Kingdom, with many colonies having waiting lists, some of which may have several times as many waiting as there are actual members.

The uniform is a turquoise sweatshirt or T-shirt, with the group colours for the neckerchief.
The motto, shared with the rest of the UK Scout Association sections, is "Be Prepared".

Baden-Powell Scouts' Association

The Baden-Powell Scouts' Association recognised Beavers in 1982, although some Groups do not operate Beaver colonies as they were not part of Baden-Powell's concept.  The programme serves five to eight year olds, and is followed by Wolf Cubs.

The uniform is a vest that can be many colours, with the group colours for the neckerchief.  Some groups also issue Beavers with caps.

United States

Boy Scouts of America
The Boy Scouts of America never organized a multi-year Beavers programme separate from Cubs. While the modern incarnation of Cubs in the United States contains programmes for grades K through 5, the path to this structure was evolutionary.

As of 1981, the earliest program available in Cubs was the Wolf Scout programme, intended for boys eight years of age. In the fall of 1982, BSA introduced the Tiger Cubs programme for 7-year-olds, as a programme distinct from the Cubs. When BSA participation was changed to grade-based instead of age-based in 1986, Tiger Cubs became the 1st grade programme, effectively changing the eligible age of most Tiger Cubs boys to 6. Tiger Cubs were opened to Cub Packs in 1993, and Tiger Dens introduced in 1995. By 2001, Tigers (as they are now called) were fully integrated into Cubs and have their own merit badge.

In 2016 a pilot programme began for Kindergarten (age 5-6) boys with a new rank, Lion. Lions became a permanent rank inside Cubs in 2018. Also in 2018, as part of the larger structural change of allowing girls into all Cub programmes, girl dens at all ranks, including Lion and Tiger, were allowed.

Baden-Powell Service Association
In the Baden-Powell Service Association, the corresponding section for this age group is called Otters.

See also

Age groups in Scouting and Guiding

References

External links
Beaver Scouts of Canada
Beaver Scouts of UK Scout Association

Early childhood education
Scouting